is the largest known variant of shogi (Japanese chess). The game was created around the mid-16th century (presumably by priests) and is based on earlier large board shogi games. Before the rediscovery of taikyoku shogi in 1997, tai shogi was believed to be the largest playable chess variant ever. It has not been shown that taikyoku shogi was ever widely played. There are only two sets of restored taikyoku shogi pieces and one of them is held at Osaka University of Commerce. One game may be played over several long sessions and require each player to make over a thousand moves.

Because the game was found only recently after centuries of obscurity, it is difficult to say exactly what all the rules were. Several documents describing the game have been found; however, there are differences between them. It is not too clear how accurate the rules given by modern sources for the game are, because many of the pieces appear in other shogi variants with a consistent move there, but are given different moves in taikyoku shogi. The board, and likewise the pieces, were made much smaller than usual for the other variants, making archeological finds difficult to decipher. Research into this game continues.

Rules of the game 

Taikyoku shogi is very different from other large-board shogi variants: tenjiku shogi, dai dai shogi, maka dai dai shogi, and tai shogi. The most notable differences lie with the piece movements and their promotions.

Objective 

The objective of the game is to capture the opponent's king(s) and prince(s). When the last of these is captured, the game ends. There are no rules for check or checkmate; however, in practice a player resigns when checkmated. Unlike standard shogi, pieces may not be dropped back into play after being captured.

Game equipment 

Two players, Black and White (or 先手 sente and 後手 gote), play on a board ruled into a grid of 36 ranks (rows) by 36 files (columns) with a total of 1,296 squares. The squares are differentiated by marking or color.

Each player has a set of 402 wedge-shaped pieces of 207 types. The players must remember 253 sets of moves. The pieces are of slightly different sizes with the larger pieces near the king and becoming progressively smaller for pieces further from the king, regardless of power. In general, the stronger pieces are nearer to the king.

Several of the English names were chosen to correspond to rough equivalents in Western chess, rather than as translations of the Japanese names.

Each piece has its name in the form of two or three kanji written on its face. On the reverse side of some pieces are two or three other characters, often in a different color (commonly red instead of black); this reverse side is used to indicate that the piece has been promoted during play. The pieces of the two sides do not differ in color, but instead each piece is shaped like a wedge, and faces forward, toward the opposing side. This shows who controls the piece during play.

Listed below are the pieces of the game and, if they promote, which pieces they promote to. Promotions prefaced with a star are not also represented as their own pieces, existing only as promotions.

(Sometimes the queen is called the "free king", a direct translation of its Japanese name. The kirin's name is sometimes anglicised as kylin.)

Setup 

Below is a diagram showing the setup of one player's pieces. The way one player sees their own pieces is the same way the opposing player will see their pieces.

Legend

 AB – Angry boar 
 B – Bishop 
 BA – Running Bear 
 BB – Blind Bear 
 BC – Beast Cadet
 BD – Buddhist Devil 
 BE – Bear Soldier 
 BG – Bishop General 
 BI – Blind Dog 
 BL – Blue Dragon
 BM – Blind Monkey 
 BN – Burning Soldier 
 BO – Beast Officer 
 BS – Boar Soldier 
 BT – Blind Tiger
 C – Copper General 
 CA – Capricorn 
 CC – Chinese Cock 
 CD – Ceramic Dove 
 CE – Cloud Eagle
 CG – Chicken General 
 CH – Chariot Soldier 
 CI – Stone Chariot 
 CK – Flying Cock 
 CL – Cloud Dragon
 CM – Climbing Monkey 
 CN – Center Standard 
 CO – Captive Officer 
 CP – Prince 
 CR – Copper Chariot
 CS – Cat Sword 
 CT – Captive Cadet 
 D – Dog 
 DE – Drunken Elephant 
 DG – Roaring Dog
 DH – Dragon Horse 
 DK – Dragon King 
 DO – Donkey 
 DM – Fire Demon 
 DS – Dark Spirit
 DV – Deva 
 EA – Earth General 
 EB – Enchanted Badger 
 EC – Earth Chariot 
 ED – Earth Dragon
 EG – Fierce Eagle 
 EL – Soaring Eagle 
 ES – Eastern Barbarian 
 EW – Evil Wolf 
 F – Fire General
 FC – Flying Cat 
 FD – Flying Dragon 
 FE – Free Eagle 
 FG – Fragrant Elephant 
 FH – Flying Horse
 FI – Fire Dragon 
 FL – Ferocious Leopard 
 FO – Forest Demon 
 FP – Free Pup
 FR – Free Demon 
 FS – Flying Swallow 
 FT – Free Dream-Eater 
 FY – Flying Goose 
 G – Gold General
 GB – Go Between 
 GC – Gold Chariot 
 GD – Great Dragon 
 GE – Great Standard 
 GG – Great General
 GL – Golden Deer 
 GM – Great Master 
 GN – Wood General 
 GO – Golden Bird 
 GR – Great Dove
 GS – Great Stag 
 GT – Great Turtle 
 GU – Guardian of the Gods 
 H – Horse General 
 HD – Howling Dog
 HE – Ram's-Head Soldier 
 HF – Horned Falcon 
 HM – Hook-Mover 
 HO – Horseman 
 HR – Running Horse
 HS – Horse Soldier 
 I – Iron General 
 K – King 
 KM – Kirin-Master 
 KR – Kirin
 L – Lance 
 LB – Longbow Soldier 
 LC – Left Chariot 
 LD – Lion Dog 
 LE – Left Dragon
 LG – Left General 
 LH – Liberated Horse 
 LI – Lion Hawk 
 LL – Little Turtle 
 LN – Lion
 LO – Long-Nosed Goblin 
 LP – Leopard Soldier 
 LS – Little Standard 
 LT – Left Tiger 
 M – Mountain General
 MF – Mountain Falcon 
 MK – Side Monkey 
 ML – Left Mountain Eagle 
 MR – Right Mountain Eagle 
 MS – Mountain Stag
 MT – Center Master 
 N – Knight 
 NB – Northern Barbarian 
 NK – Neighboring King 
 NT – Violent wolf
 O – Ox General 
 OC – Oxcart 
 OK – Old Kite 
 OM – Old Monkey 
 OR – Old Rat
 OS – Ox Soldier 
 OW – Swooping Owl 
 OX – Flying Ox 
 P – Pawn 
 PC – Peacock
 PG – Pup General 
 PH – Phoenix 
 PI – Pig General 
 PM – Phoenix-Master 
 PR – Prancing Stag
 PS – Poisonous Snake 
 Q – Queen
 R – Rook 
 RA – Rain Dragon 
 RB – Rushing Bird 
 RC – Right Chariot
 RD – Reclining Dragon 
 RE – River General 
 RG – Right General 
 RH – Running Chariot 
 RI – Right Dragon
 RM – Roc-Master 
 RN – Running Stag 
 RO – Rook General 
 RP – Running Pup 
 RR – Running Rabbit
 RS – Rear Standard 
 RT – Running Tiger 
 RU – Running Serpent 
 RV – Reverse Chariot 
 RW – Running Wolf
 S – Silver General 
 SA – Side Boar 
 SC – Crossbow Soldier 
 SD – Front Standard 
 SE – Sword Soldier
 SF – Side-Flyer 
 SG – Stone General 
 SI – Side Dragon 
 SL – Side Soldier 
 SM – Side Mover
 SN – Coiled Serpent 
 SO – Soldier 
 SP – Spear Soldier 
 SQ – Square-Mover 
 SR – Silver Rabbit
 SS – Side Serpent 
 ST – Strutting Crow 
 SU – Southern Barbarian 
 SV – Silver Chariot 
 SW – Swallow's Wings
 SX – Side Ox 
 T – Tile General 
 TC – Tile Chariot 
 TD – Turtle Dove 
 TF – Treacherous Fox 
 TG – Savage Tiger
 TS – Turtle-snake 
 TT – Right Tiger 
 VB – Violent Bear 
 VD – Violent Dragon 
 VE – Vertical Bear
 VG – Vice General 
 VH – Vertical Horse 
 VI – Vermillion Sparrow 
 VL – Vertical Leopard 
 VM – Vertical Mover
 VO – Violent Ox 
 VP – Vertical Pup 
 VR – Vertical Soldier 
 VS – Violent Stag 
 VT – Vertical Tiger
 VW – Vertical Wolf 
 W – Whale 
 WA – Water Dragon 
 WB – Water Buffalo 
 WC – Wood Chariot
 WD – Wind Dragon 
 WE – White Elephant 
 WF – Side Wolf 
 WG – Water General 
 WH – White Horse
 WL – Woodland Demon 
 WN – Wind General 
 WO – Wooden Dove 
 WR – Wrestler 
 WS – Western Barbarian
 WT – White Tiger 
 YA – Yaksha 

The Howling Dog pieces (HD) are placed on the left and right depending on their promotions; the Howling dog that promotes to a Left Dog on the left, and the Howling Dog that promotes to a Right Dog on the right.

The queen could also be abbreviated FK (for free king) and the kirin as Ky (for kylin).

Game play 

The players alternate making a move, with Black moving first. (The traditional terms 'black' and 'white' are used to differentiate the sides during discussion of the game, but are no longer literally descriptive.) A move consists of moving a single piece on the board and potentially promoting that piece or displacing (capturing) an opposing piece.

Movement and capture 

Most pieces in the game move in a unique manner. An opposing piece is captured by displacement: That is, if a piece moves to a square occupied by an opposing piece, the opposing piece is displaced and removed from the board. A piece cannot move to a square occupied by a friendly piece (meaning another piece controlled by the moving player).

Each piece on the game moves in a characteristic pattern. Pieces move either orthogonally (that is, forward, backward, left, or right, in the direction of one of the arms of a plus sign, +), or diagonally (in the direction of one of the arms of a multiplication sign, ×). The lion, lion hawk and knight are exceptions at the beginning of the game, in that they do not move, or are not required to move, in a straight line. (The Buddhist spirit, teaching king, heavenly horse and furious fiend are similar, but they only appear as pieces promote.)

Categories of movement

Many pieces are capable of several kinds of movement, with the type of movement most often depending on the direction in which they move. The movement categories are:

Step movers

Some pieces move only one square at a time. (If a friendly piece occupies an adjacent square, the moving piece may not move in that direction; if an opposing piece is there, it may be displaced and captured.)

The step movers are the prince, generals (except: bishop, rook, pig, vice, great and wood), wolves, earth dragon, running horse, running rabbit, turtle snake, turtle dove, flying swallow, rain dragon, mountain stag, running pup, running serpent, side serpent, yaksha, Buddhist devil, violent stag, drunken elephant, neighboring king, chariots (except: reverse, running and copper), right tiger, left tiger, wind dragon, free pup, rushing bird, old kite, bears (except running), side boar, cloud eagle, flying cat, little standard, cloud dragon, soldiers (except soldier and chariot), violent ox, dark spirit, deva, howling dog, side mover, prancing stag, ferocious leopard, fierce eagle, poisonous snake, flying goose, strutting crow, blind dog, Chinese cock, phoenix, kirin, side ox, angry boar, liberated horse, flying cock, monkeys, barbarians, vermillion sparrow, swooping owl, old rat, cat sword, swallow's wings, blind tiger, side flyer, coiled serpent, reclining dragon, go between, dog, vertical mover, vertical pup, vertical horse, dragon horse, dragon king and pawn.

Limited ranging pieces

Some pieces can move along a limited number (2 to 7) of free (empty) squares along a straight line in certain directions. Other than the limited distance, they move like ranging pieces (see below).

The limited ranging pieces are the king, standards, free dream-eater, wooden dove, dragons (except: rain, side, wind, cloud, flying and reclining), demons, beast cadet, mountain eagle, white tiger, ceramic dove, turtle dove, captive officer, mountain stag, side serpent, great dove, running tiger, running bear, yaksha, Buddhist devil, guardian of the Gods, wrestler, gold chariot, running stag, beast officer, free pup, rushing bird, old kite, peacock, phoenix master, kirin master, silver chariot, vertical bear, pig general, chicken general, horse general, ox general, silver rabbit, golden deer, captive cadet, great stag, stone chariot, cloud eagle, mountain falcon, vertical tiger, copper chariot, golden bird, prancing stag, water buffalo, fierce eagle, water general, mountain general, fire general, turtles, vertical wolf, donkey, enchanted badger, flying horse, angry boar, violent bear, liberated horse, barbarians, center master, roc master, horseman, soldiers (except: rook, ram's-head, spear and sword), wing general, wind general, wood general, great master and roaring dog.

Jumping pieces

Several pieces can jump, that is, they can pass over any intervening piece, whether friend or foe, with no effect on either.

The jumping pieces are the wooden dove, running horse, mountain eagle, phoenix master, kirin master, knight, lion, great stag, vice general, flying cat, mountain falcon, golden bird, flying dragon, phoenix, kirin, turtles, treacherous fox, center master, roc master, free eagle, lion hawk, great master, horned falcon, soaring eagle, roaring dog and lion dog.

Ranging pieces

Many pieces can move any number of empty squares along a straight line, limited only by the edge of the board. If an opposing piece intervenes, it may be captured by moving to that square and removing it from the board. A ranging piece must stop where it captures, and cannot bypass a piece that is in its way. If a friendly piece intervenes, the moving piece is limited to a distance that stops short of the intervening piece; if the friendly piece is adjacent, it cannot move in that direction at all.

The ranging pieces are the standards, queen, free dream-eater, wooden dove, dragons (except: violent, flying and reclining), demons, running horse, mountain eagle, whale, running rabbit, tigers (except blind), turtle snake, ceramic dove, lance, oxcart, chariots, flying swallow, running pup, running serpent, great dove, running bear, running stag, running wolf, free pup, phoenix master, kirin master, vertical bear, side boar, silver rabbit, golden deer, great stag, cloud eagle, bishop, rook, side wolf, mountain falcon, soldiers (except: sword, burning and crossbow), violent ox, golden bird, white horse, howling dog, side mover, water buffalo, turtles, vertical wolf, side ox, liberated horse, treacherous fox, roc master, vermillion sparrow, horseman, swallow's wings, side flyer, great master, side monkey, vertical mover, flying ox, vertical pup, vertical horse, dragon horse, dragon king, horned falcon, soaring eagle, roaring dog and lion dog.

Hook moves (changing tack)

The hook-mover, long-nosed goblin, capricorn, and peacock can move any number of squares along a straight line, as a normal ranging piece, but may also abruptly change tack left or right by 90° at any one place along the route, and then continue as a ranging piece. Turning a corner like this is optional.

The range covered by a hook move is the equivalent of two moves by a rook, or two moves by a bishop, depending on the piece. However, a hook move is functionally a single move: The piece cannot capture twice in one move, nor may it capture and then move on. It must stop before an intervening piece (unless it first changes direction to avoid it), and must stop when it captures, just like any other ranging piece. It can only change direction once per move.

Area movers

The lion and lion hawk may take multiple (2) steps in a single turn. These do not have to be in a line, so these pieces can potentially reach every square within two or three steps of the starting square, not just squares along one of the diagonals or orthogonals. Such moves are also useful to get around obstructions. An area mover must stop where it captures.

Limited range jumping pieces

The golden bird and several promoted pieces have the option of jumping a limited number of squares, and then continuing on in the same direction as a ranging piece.

Range jumping (flying) pieces

The ancient dragon may jump over any number of pieces, friend or foe, along a straight line, but only when making a capture. Otherwise it moves as a ranging piece.

Range capturing pieces

The great general, vice general, rook general, bishop general, violent dragon and flying crocodile may jump over any number of pieces, friend or foe, along a diagonal or orthogonal. They capture all pieces they jump.

However, they may only jump pieces of lower rank, whether friend or foe. The relevant ranking is:
King, prince
Great general
Vice general
Rook general, bishop general, violent dragon, flying crocodile

Individual pieces

Pawn (歩兵) 
Step: The pawn can move one square orthogonally forward.
Betza Notation: fW

Earth general (土将) and go between (仲人) 
Step: The earth general and go between can move one square orthogonally forward or backward.
Notation: vW
They have the same range of movement but promote differently (see above).

Stone general (石将) 
Step: The stone general can move one square diagonally forward.
Notation: fF

Because it cannot move orthogonally or backward, a stone general can only reach less than half the squares on the board.

Iron general (鉄将) and dog (犬) 
Step: The iron general and dog can move one square forward, orthogonally or diagonally.
Notation: fWfF
They have the same range of movement but promote differently (see above).

Swooping owl (鴟行), old rat (老鼠) and Strutting crow (烏行) 
Step: The swooping owl, old rat and strutting crow can move one square orthogonally forward or diagonally backward.
Notation: fWbF
They have the same range of movement but promote differently (see above).

Tile general (瓦将) and sword soldier (刀兵) 
Step: The tile general and sword soldier can move one square diagonally forward or orthogonally backward.
Notation: bWfF
They have the same range of movement but promote differently (see above).

Copper general (銅将), flying goose (鳫飛) and climbing monkey (登猿) 
Step: The copper general can move one square orthogonally forward or backward, or diagonally forward.
Notation: vWfF
They have the same range of movement but each promotes differently (see above).

Reclining dragon (臥龍) 
Step: The reclining dragon can move one square in the four orthogonal directions.
Notation: W

Coiled serpent (蟠蛇) 
Step: The coiled serpent can move one square orthogonally forward or backward; or diagonally backward.
Notation: vWbF

Flying cock (鶏飛) 
Step: The flying cock can move one square orthogonally sideways or diagonally forward.
Notation: sWfF

Cat sword (猫刄) 
Step: The cat sword can move one square in the four diagonal directions.
Notation: F

Because it cannot move orthogonally, a cat sword can only reach half the squares on the board.

Evil wolf (悪狼) 
Step: The evil wolf can move one square orthogonally sideways or forward; or diagonally forward.
Notation: fFfsW

Silver general (銀将) and violent stag (猛鹿) 
Step: The silver general and violent stag can move one square in the four diagonal directions; or one square orthogonally forward.
Notation: FfW
They have the same range of movement but promote differently (see above).

Blind dog (盲犬) and Chinese cock (淮鶏) 
Step: The blind dog and Chinese cock can move one square orthogonally backward or sideways or one square diagonally forward.
Notation: fFbsW
They have the same range of movement but promote differently (see above).

Old monkey (古猿) 
Step: The old monkey can move one square in the four diagonal directions or orthogonally backward.
Notation: FbW

Gold general (金将) and violent wolf (猛狼) 
Step: The gold general and violent wolf can step one square in the four orthogonal directions or diagonally forward, giving them six possibilities.
They cannot move diagonally backward.
Notation: WfF
The pieces have the same range of movement but promote differently (see above).

Ferocious leopard (猛豹) 
Step: The ferocious leopard can move one square in the four diagonal directions; or orthogonally forward or backward.
Notation: FvW

Blind monkey (盲猿) and blind bear (盲熊) 
Step: The blind monkey and blind bear can move one square in the four diagonal directions or orthogonally sideways.
Notation: FsW

Drunken elephant (醉象), neighboring king (近王) and Rushing boar (行猪) 
Step: The drunken elephant, neighboring king and rushing boar can move one square in any direction, orthogonal or diagonal, except orthogonally backward.
Notation: FfsW
They have the same range of movement but promote differently (see above).

Deva (提婆) 
Step: The Deva can move one square in any direction orthogonally or diagonally, except diagonally forward to the right.
Notation: WflFbF

Dark spirit (無明) 
Step: The dark spirit can move one square in any direction orthogonally or diagonally, except diagonally forward to the left.
Notation: WfrFbF

Blind tiger (盲虎) 
Step: The blind tiger can move one square in any direction, orthogonal or diagonal, except orthogonally forward.
Notation: FbsW

Prince (太子), left general (左将), right general (右将), bear's eyes (熊眼) and venomous wolf (毒狼) 
Step: The prince, left and right generals, bear's eyes and venomous wolf can step one square in any direction, orthogonal or diagonal.
Notation: WF
A prince may move into check (not recommended).
The pieces have the same range of movement but promote differently (see above).

Wood general (木将) 
Limited range: The wood general can move one or two squares diagonally forward.
Notation: fF2

Donkey (驢馬) and enchanted badger (変狸) 
Limited range: The donkey and enchanted badger can move one or two squares in the four orthogonal directions.
Notation: W2
Their range of movement and promotions are the same.

Flying horse (馬麟) 
Limited range: The flying horse can move one or two squares in the four diagonal directions.
Notation: F2

Beast cadet (獣曹) 
Limited range: The beast cadet can move one or two squares orthogonally forward, sideways or in the four diagonal directions.
Notation: F2fsW2

King (玉将), fragrant elephant (香象) and white elephant (白象) 
Limited range: The king, fragrant elephant and white elephant can move one or two squares in any direction, orthogonal or diagonal.
Notation: W2F2
The king may move into check (not recommended).
The elephants have the same promotion.

Rushing bird (行鳥) 
Step: The rushing bird can move one square orthogonally sideways or in the four diagonal directions.
Limited range: It can move one or two squares orthogonally forward.
Notation: FfsWfnD

Angry boar (嗔猪) 
Step: The angry boar can move one square orthogonally forward or sideways; or
Limited range: It can move one or two squares diagonally forward.
Notation: fF2fsW

Violent bear (猛熊) 
Limited range: The violent bear can move one or two squares diagonally forward.
Step: It can move one square orthogonally sideways.
Step: One version of the game has the violent bear moving one square orthogonally forward; another version has it moving one square diagonally backward.
Notation: fF2fsW (or FsWfnA in the other version)

Eastern barbarian (東夷) and western barbarian (西戎) 
Limited range: The eastern barbarian and western barbarian can move one or two squares orthogonally forward or backward.
Step: They can move one square orthogonally sideways or diagonally forward.
Notation: WfFfnD
They have the same range of movement but promote differently (see above).

Northern barbarian (北狄), southern barbarian (南蛮) and prancing stag (踊鹿)
Limited range: The northern barbarian, southern barbarian and prancing stag can move one or two squares orthogonally sideways.
Step: They can move one square orthogonally forward or backward or diagonally forward.
Notation: WfFsnD
They have the same range of movement but promote differently (see above).

Poisonous snake (毒蛇) 
Step: The poisonous snake can move one square orthogonally backward or diagonally forward.
Limited range: It can moves one or two squares orthogonally forward or sideways.
Notation: WfFfsnD

Old kite (古鵄) 
Kite here refers to the bird of prey.
Limited range: The old kite can move one or two squares in the four diagonal directions; or
Step: It can move one square orthogonally sideways.
Notation: F2sW

Fierce eagle (猛鷲) 
Limited range: The fierce eagle can move one or two squares in the four diagonal directions.
Step: It can move one square orthogonally forward or sideways.
Notation: F2fsW

Guardian of the gods (金剛) 
Limited range: The guardian of the gods can move one to three squares in the four orthogonal directions.
Notation: W3

Wrestler (力士) 
Limited range: The wrestler can move one to three squares in the four diagonal directions.
Notation: F3

Captive cadet (禽曹) 
Limited range: The captive cadet can move one to three squares orthogonally forward or sideways, or in the four diagonal directions.
Notation: F3fsW3

When it promotes to a captive officer (see above), it demotes (moving only two squares orthogonally instead of three).

Horse general (馬将), ox general (牛将), wind general (風将) and river general (川将)
Step: The horse general, the ox general, the wind general and the river general can move one square orthogonally backward or diagonally forward.
Limited range: They can move one to three squares orthogonally forward.
Notation: fFbWfW3
These pieces and their promotions have the same range of motion.

Fire general (火将) 
Step: The fire general can move one square diagonally forward.
Limited range: It can move one to three squares orthogonally forward or backward.
Notation: fFvW3

Water general (水将) and mountain general (山将) 
Step: The water general and mountain general can move one square orthogonally forward or backward.
Limited range: They can move one to three squares diagonally forward.
Notation: fF3vW
They have the same range of movement but promote differently (see above).

Buddhist devil (羅刹) 
Limited range: The Buddhist devil can move one to three squares diagonally forward.
Step: It can move one square orthogonally sideways or backward.
Notation: fF3bsW

Yaksha (夜叉) 
Step: The yaksha can move one square orthogonally backward or diagonally forward.
Limited range: It can move one to three squares orthogonally sideways.
Notation: fFbWsW3

Sword general (刀将) 
Step: The sword general can move one square orthogonally backward.
Limited range: It can move one to three squares forward, orthogonally or diagonally.
Notation: bWfW3fF3

Captive officer (禽吏) 
Limited range: The captive officer can move one or two squares orthogonally forward or sideways; or
Limited range: It can move one to three squares in the four diagonal directions
Notation: F3fsW2

Beast officer (獣吏) 
Limited range: The beast officer can move one or two squares orthogonally sideways.
Limited range: It can move one to three squares orthogonally forward or in the four diagonal directions.
Notation: F3fsW2fnH

Heavenly tetrarch (四天) 
Limited range: The heavenly tetrarch can move one to four squares in any direction, orthogonal or diagonal.
Notation: W4F4

Chicken general (鶏将) and pup general (狗将) 
Step: The chicken general and pup general can move one square diagonally backward.
Limited range: They can move one to four squares orthogonally forward.
Notation: bFfW4
They have the same range of movement but promote differently (see above).

Pig general (豚将) 
Limited range: The pig general can move one or two squares orthogonally backward; or
Limited range: It can move one to four squares diagonally forward.
Notation: bW2fF4

Mountain stag (山鹿) 
Step: The mountain stag can move one square orthogonally forward.
Limited range: It can move one or two squares orthogonally sideways.
Limited range: It can move one to three squares diagonally forward.
Limited range: It can move one to four squares orthogonally backward.
Notation: fF2fWsW2bW4

Leopard king (豹王) 
Limited range: The leopard king can move one to five squares in any direction, orthogonal or diagonal.
Notation: W5F5

Turtle dove (山鳩) 
Step: The turtle dove can move one square orthogonally backward or sideways.
Limited range: It can move one to five squares diagonally forward.
Notation: fF5bsW

Crossbow soldier (弓兵) 
Step: The crossbow soldier can move one square orthogonally backward.
Limited range: It can move one to three squares orthogonally sideways or diagonally forward.
Limited range: It can move one to five squares orthogonally forward.
Notation: fF3bWsW3fW5

Burning soldier (炮兵) 
Step: The burning soldier can move one square orthogonally backward.
Limited range: It can move one to three squares orthogonally sideways.
Limited range: It can move one to five squares diagonally forward.
Limited range: It can move one to seven squares orthogonally forward.
Notation: fF5bWsW3fW7

Lance (香車), oxcart (牛車), and savage tiger (猛虎) 
Ranging: The lance, oxcart and savage tiger can move any number of free squares in a straight line orthogonally forward.
Notation: fWW
They have the same range of movement but promote differently (see above).

Reverse chariot (反車) 
Ranging: The reverse chariot can move any number of free squares in a straight line orthogonally forward or backward.
Notation: vWW

Side dragon (横龍) 
Ranging: The side dragon can move any number of free squares in a straight line orthogonally forward or sideways.
Notation: fsWW

Mountain witch (山母) 
Range: The mountain witch can move any number of free squares in a straight line backward, orthogonally or diagonally.
Notation: bWWbFF
When it reaches the first rank, it must stay there until captured.

White horse (白駒), bird of paradise (⿰古寺·⿱時鳥) and multi-general (雜将) 
Ranging: The white horse, bird of paradise and multi general can move any number of free squares in a straight line orthogonally forward or backward.
Ranging: They can move any number of free squares in a straight line diagonally forward.
Notation: vWWfFF

Rook (飛車), soldier (兵士), running chariot (走車), square-mover (方行) and gliding swallow (燕行) 
Ranging: The rook, soldier, running chariot, square-mover and gliding swallow can move any number of free squares in a straight line in the four orthogonal directions.
They have the same range of motion but promote differently (see above).
Notation: WW

Free serpent (奔蛇), coiled dragon (蟠龍) and whale (鯨鯢) 
Range: The free serpent, the coiled dragon and the whale can move any number of free squares in a straight line orthogonally forward, backward, or diagonally backward.
Notation: vWWbFF

Bishop (角行) 
Ranging: A bishop can move any number of free squares in a straight line in the four diagonal directions.
Notation: FF

Because it cannot move orthogonally, a bishop can only reach half the squares on the board.

Free wolf (奔狼) and running leopard (走豹) 
Range: The free wolf and running leopard can move any number of free squares in a straight line orthogonally forward, sideways or diagonally forward.
Notation: fFFfsWW

Wizard stork (仙·⿱而鷦) 
Range: The wizard stork can move any number of free squares in a straight line orthogonally sideways, backward or diagonally forward.
Notation: fFFbsWW

Flying ox (飛牛), free bear (奔熊), free leopard (奔豹) and great whale (大鯨) 
Ranging: The flying ox, the free bear, the free leopard and the great whale can move any number of free squares in a straight line in the four diagonal directions.
Ranging:  It can move any number of free squares in a straight line orthogonally forward or backward.
Notation: FFvWW

Treacherous fox (隠狐) 
Ranging: The treacherous fox can move any number of free squares in a straight line orthogonally forward or backward, or in the four diagonal directions.
Jump: One version of the game allows it to jump to the second or third square in those directions then move, another does not.
Notation:  FFvWW.  In the version that allows the jumping to the second or third squares and continuing, the notation can be represented as FFAGvWWvDvH(mAmG-FF)(mvDmvH-WW)

Cavalier (騎士) and strong chariot (強車) 
Range: The cavalier and strong chariot can move any number of free squares in a straight line diagonally forward or in the four orthogonal directions.
Notation: WWfFF

Free dragon (奔龍) and free tiger (奔虎) 
Range: The free dragon and free tiger can move any number of free squares in a straight line in any direction, orthogonal or diagonal, except orthogonally forward.
Notation: FFbsWW

Queen (奔王), free stag (奔鹿) and strong eagle (勁鷲) 
Ranging: The queen, the free stag and the strong eagle can move any number of free squares in a straight line in any direction, orthogonal or diagonal.
Notation: WWFF

Howling dog (left and right) (𠵇犬) 
Step: The howling dog can move one square orthogonally backward.
Ranging: It can move any number of free squares in a straight line orthogonally forward.
Notation: bWfWW
The left and right howling dogs have the same range of motion but promote differently (see above).

Vertical horse (竪馬) 
Step: The vertical horse can move one square diagonally forward or orthogonally backward.
Ranging: It can move any number of free squares in a straight line orthogonally forward.
Notation: fFbWfWW

Spear soldier (鎗兵) 
Step: The spear soldier can move one square orthogonally backward or sideways.
Ranging: It can move any number of free squares in a straight line orthogonally forward.
Notation: WfWW

Vertical pup (竪狗) 
Step: The vertical pup can move one square backward, orthogonally or diagonally.
Ranging: It can move any number of free squares in a straight line orthogonally forward.
Notation: bFbWfWW

Raiding falcon (延鷹) 
Step: The raiding falcon can move one square diagonally forward.
Step: The raiding falcon can move one square orthogonally sideways.
Range: It can move any number of free squares in a straight line orthogonally forward.
Notation: fFsWfWW

Right iron chariot (右鉄車) 
Step: The right iron chariot can move one square in the four orthogonal directions.
Range: It can move any number of free squares in a straight line diagonally backward to the left.
Notation: WblFF

Left iron chariot (左鉄車) 
Step: The left iron chariot can move one square in the four orthogonal directions.
Range: It can move any number of free squares in a straight line diagonally backward to the right.
Notation: WbrFF

Vertical leopard (竪豹) 
Step: The vertical leopard can move one square orthogonally backward, sideways or diagonally forward.
Ranging: It can move any number of free squares in a straight line orthogonally forward.
Notation: WfFfWW

Right dog (右犬) 
Step: The right dog can move one square orthogonally backward.
Range: It can move any number of free squares in a straight line orthogonally forward or diagonally backward to the left.
Notation: bWfWWblFF

Left dog (左犬) 
Step: The left dog can move one square orthogonally backward.
Range: It can move any number of free squares in a straight line orthogonally forward or diagonally backward to the right.
Notation: bWfWWbrFF

Ram's-head soldier (羊兵) and Flying swallow (飛燕) 
Ranging: The ram's-head soldier and the flying swallow can move any number of free squares in a straight line diagonally forward.
Step: It can move one square orthogonally backward.
Notation: bWfFF

Wood chariot (木車) 
Step: The wood chariot can move one square diagonally forward to the left or diagonally backward to the right.
Ranging: It can move any number of free squares in a straight line orthogonally forward or backward.
Notation: flFbrFvWW

Tile chariot (瓦車) 
Step: The tile chariot can move one square diagonally forward to the right or diagonally backward to the left.
Ranging: It can move any number of free squares in a straight line orthogonally forward or backward.
Notation: frFblFvWW

Running boar (走猪),  Running pup (走狗),  running serpent (走蛇), Earth chariot (土車) and Vertical-mover (竪行). 
Step:  The running boar, running pup,  running serpent, earth chariot and vertical-mover can move one square orthogonally sideways.
Ranging: They can move any number of free squares in a straight line orthogonally forward or backward.
They have the same range of movement but promote differently (see above).
Notation: WvWW

Violent ox (猛牛) 
Step: The violent ox can move one square orthogonally forward or backward.
Ranging: It can move any number of free squares in a straight line diagonally forward.
Notation: vWfFF

Side wolf (横狼) 
Step: The side wolf can move one square diagonally forward to the left or diagonally backward to the right.
Ranging: It can move any number of free squares in a straight line orthogonally sideways.
Notation: flFbrFsWW

Side ox (横牛) 
Step: The side ox can move one square diagonally forward to the right or diagonally backward to the left.
Ranging: It can move any number of squares orthogonally sideways.
Notation: frFblFsWW

Side-mover (横行) 
Ranging: The side-mover can move any number of free squares in a straight line orthogonally sideways.
Step: It can move one square orthogonally forward or backward.
Notation: WsWW

Side monkey (横猿) 
Step: The side monkey can move one square diagonally forward or orthogonally backward.
Ranging: It can move any number of free squares in a straight line orthogonally sideways.
Notation: bWfFsWW

Divine sparrow (神雀) 
Step: The divine sparrow can move one square diagonally forward to the left or in the four orthogonal directions.
Range: It can move any number of free squares in a straight line diagonally backward or forward to the left.
Notation:  WlF.  If the description is interpreted as the second diagram, the notation can be represented as WflFbF

Note : this description is ambiguous and can be interpreted two ways.

Plodding ox (歬牛) 
Step: The plodding ox can move one square in the four diagonal directions.
Range: It can move any number of free squares in a straight line orthogonally forward or backward.
Notation: FvR

Swallow's wings (燕羽) 
Step: The Swallow's wings can move one square orthogonally forward or backward.
Ranging: It can move any number of free squares in a straight line orthogonally sideways.
Notation: WfFsWW

Side-flyer (横飛) 
Step: The side-flyer can move one square in the four diagonal directions; or
Ranging: It can move any number of free squares in a straight line orthogonally sideways.
Notation: FsWW

Flying stag (飛鹿) and copper elephant (銅象) 
Step: The flying stag and copper elephant can move one square orthogonally sideways or in the four diagonal directions.
Range: They can move any number of free squares in a straight line orthogonally forward or backward.
Notation: FWvWW

Vermillion sparrow (朱雀) 
Step: The vermillion sparrow can move one square in the four orthogonal directions, or diagonally forward to the right or diagonally backward to the left.
Ranging: It can move any number of free squares in a straight line diagonally forward to the left or diagonally backward to the right.
Notation: WFflFFbrFF

Turtle-snake (玄武) 
Ranging: The turtle-snake can move any number of free squares in a straight line diagonally forward to the right or backward to the left.
Step: It can move one square in any of the remaining directions.
Notation: WFfrFFblFF

Side boar (横猪) 
Step: The side boar can move one square orthogonally forward or backward; or in the four diagonal directions.
Ranging: It can move any number of free squares in a straight line orthogonally sideways.
Notation: WFsWW

Left chariot (左車) 
Ranging: The left chariot can move any number of free squares in a straight line orthogonally forward.
Ranging: It can move any number of free squares in a straight line diagonally forward to the left.
Ranging: It can move any number of free squares in a straight line diagonally backward to the right.
Step: It can move one square orthogonally left.
Notation: lWfWWflFFbrFF

Right chariot (右車) 
Ranging: The right chariot can move any number of free squares in a straight line orthogonally forward.
Ranging: It can move any number of free squares in a straight line diagonally forward to the right.
Ranging: It can move any number of free squares in a straight line diagonally backward to the left.
Step: It can move one square orthogonally right.
Notation: rWfWWfrFFblFF

Great tiger (大虎) 
Step: The great tiger can move one square orthogonally forward.
Range: It can move any number of free squares in a straight line orthogonally sideways or backward.
Notation: WbsWW

Right tiger (右虎) 
Step: The right tiger can move one square diagonally right.
Ranging: It can move any number of free squares in a straight line orthogonally left or diagonally left.
Notation: FlWWlFF

Left tiger (左虎) 
Step: The left tiger can move one square diagonally left.
Ranging: It can move any number of free squares in a straight line orthogonally right or diagonally right.
Notation: FrWWrFF

Great bear (大熊) 
Step: The great bear can move one square orthogonally sideways or backward.
Range: It can move any number of free squares in a straight line forward, orthogonally or diagonally.
Notation: WfWWfFF

Running rabbit (走兎) 
Step: The running rabbit can move one square orthogonally or diagonally backward.
Ranging: It can move any number of free squares in a straight line orthogonally or diagonally forward.
Notation: bWbFfWWfFF

Left army (左軍) 
Step: The left army can move one square orthogonally forward, backward, right or diagonally right.
Range: It can move any number of free squares in a straight line left, orthogonally or diagonally.
Notation: WFlWWlFF

Right army (右軍) 
Step: The right army can move one square orthogonally forward, backward, left or diagonally left.
Range: It can move any number of free squares in a straight line right, orthogonally or diagonally.
Notation: WFrWWrFF

Divine turtle (神亀) 
Step: The divine turtle can move one square diagonally forward to the left or in the four orthogonal directions.
Range: It can move any number of free squares in a straight line along either rear diagonal, or diagonally forward to the right.
Notation: WFfrFFbFF

Running wolf (走狼) 
Step: The running wolf can move one square orthogonally forward.
Ranging: It can move any number of free squares in a straight line orthogonally sideways or diagonally forward.
Notation: fWfFFsWW

Flying falcon (飛鷹) 
Step: The flying falcon can move one square orthogonally forward.
Range: It can move any number of squares in the four diagonal directions.
Notation: FFfW

Burning chariot (炮車) 
Step: The burning chariot can move one square orthogonally sideways.
Range: It can move any number of free squares in a straight line orthogonally forward, backward or diagonally forward.
Notation: WfFFvWW

Dragon king (龍王) 
Ranging: A dragon king can move any number of free squares in a straight line in the four orthogonal directions.
Step: It can move one square in the four diagonal directions.
Notation: WWF

Dragon horse (龍馬) 
Ranging: A dragon horse can move any number of free squares in a straight line in the four diagonal directions.
Step: It can move one square in the four orthogonal directions.
Notation: WFF

Free boar (奔猪) 
Step: The free boar can move one square orthogonally backward.
Range: It can move any number of free squares in a straight line orthogonally forward, sideways or diagonally forward.
Notation: WfsWWfFF

Wind dragon (風龍) 
Step: The wind dragon can move one square diagonally backward to the left.
Ranging: It can move any number of free squares in a straight line orthogonally sideways, diagonally forward or diagonally backward to the right.
Notation: FfFFbrFFsWW

Cloud dragon (雲龍) 
Step: The cloud dragon can move one square orthogonally forward or sideways.
Ranging: It can move any number of free squares in a straight line orthogonally backward or in the four diagonal directions.
Notation: FFWbWW

Rain dragon (雨龍) 
Step: The rain dragon can move one square orthogonally or diagonally forward.
Ranging: It can move any number of free squares in a straight line orthogonally sideways or backward; or diagonally backward.
Notation: WbsWWFbFF

Fire ox (火牛) and violent wind (暴風) 
Step: The fire ox and violent wind can move one square orthogonally sideways.
Range: They can move any number of free squares in a straight line orthogonally backward, forward or in the four diagonal directions.
Notation: FFWvWW

Chinese river (淮川) 
Step: The Chinese river can move one square orthogonally forward or backward.
Range: It can move any number of free squares in a straight line orthogonally sideways or in the four diagonal directions.
Notation: FFWsWW

Vertical tiger (竪虎) 
Limited range: The vertical tiger can move one or two squares orthogonally backward.
Ranging: It can move any number of free squares in a straight line orthogonally forward.
Notation: fWWbW2

Wind snapping turtle (風鼈) 
Limited range: The wind snapping turtle can move one or two squares diagonally forward.
Range: It can move any number of free squares in a straight line orthogonally forward or backward.
Notation: fF2vWW

Running tile (走瓦), Running tiger (走虎) and running bear (走熊) 
Limited range: The running tile move, running tiger and running bear can move one or two squares orthogonally sideways.
Ranging: They can move any number of free squares in a straight line orthogonally forward or backward.
They have the same range of movement but promote differently (see above).
Notation: sW2vWW

Golden deer (金鹿) 
Ranging: The golden deer can move any number of free squares in a straight line diagonally forward.
Limited range: It can move one or two squares diagonally backward.
Notation: bF2fFF

Silver rabbit (銀兎) 
Limited range: The silver rabbit can move one or two squares diagonally forward.
Ranging: It can move any number of free squares in a straight line diagonally backward.
Notation: fF2bFF

Walking heron (歩䳲) 
Limited range: The walking heron can move one or two squares orthogonally sideways or diagonally forward.
Range: It can move any number of free squares in a straight line orthogonally forward or backward.
Notation: sW2fF2vWW

Young bird (𦬨鳥) 
Limited range: The young bird can move one or two squares orthogonally sideways or diagonally backward.
Range: It can move any number of free squares in a straight line orthogonally forward or backward.
Notation: sW2bF2vWW

Right dragon (右龍) 
Limited range: The right dragon can move one or two squares orthogonally right.
Ranging: It can move any number of free squares in a straight line orthogonally left or diagonally left.
Notation: rW2lWWlFF

Left dragon (左龍) 
Limited range: The left dragon can move one or two squares orthogonally left.
Ranging: It can move any number of free squares in a straight line orthogonally right or diagonally right.
Notation: lW2rWWrFF

Blue dragon (青龍) 
Ranging: The blue dragon can move any number of free squares in a straight line orthogonally forward or backward, or diagonally forward to the right.
Limited range: It can move one or two squares orthogonally sideways.
Notation: sW2vWWfrFF

White tiger (白虎) 
Ranging: The white tiger can move any number of free squares in a straight line orthogonally sideways, or diagonally forward to the left.
Limited range: It can move one or two squares orthogonally forward or backward.
Notation: vW2sWWflFF

Divine tiger (神虎) 
Limited range: The divine tiger can move one or two squares orthogonally backward.
Range: It can move any number of free squares in a straight line orthogonally forward, sideways, or diagonally forward to the left.
Notation: bW2fsWWflFF

Divine dragon (神龍) 
Limited range: The divine dragon can move one or two squares orthogonally left.
Range: It can move any number of free squares in a straight line orthogonally forward, right, backward or diagonally forward to the right.
Notation: lW2rvWWfrFF

Running stag (奔鹿) 
Limited range: The running stag can move one or two squares orthogonally backward.
Ranging: It can move any number of free squares in a straight line orthogonally sideways or diagonally forward.
Notation: bW2sWWfFF

Rear standard (後旗) 
Limited range: The rear standard can move one or two squares diagonally.
Ranging: It can move any number of free squares in a straight line orthogonally
Notation: F2WW

Ceramic dove (鳩盤) and Elephant king (象王) 
Limited range: The ceramic dove and the elephant king can move one or two squares in the four orthogonal directions.
Ranging: It can move any number of free squares in a straight line in the four diagonal directions
Notation: W2FF

Woodland demon (林鬼) and Free chicken (奔鶏) 
Limited range: The woodland demon and the free chicken can move one or two squares orthogonally sideways or backward.
Ranging: It can move any number of free squares in a straight line orthogonally forward or backward, or diagonally forward.
Notation: sW2vWWfFF

Horseman (騎兵) and Great horse (大駒) 
Limited range: The horseman and the great horse can move one or two squares orthogonally sideways.
Ranging: It can move any number of free squares in a straight line orthogonally forward or backward, or diagonally forward.
Notation: sW2vWWfFF

Free dog (奔犬) 
Limited range: The free dog can move one or two squares orthogonally sideways or diagonally backward.
Range: It can move any number of free squares in a straight line orthogonally forward, backward or diagonally forward.
Notation: sW2bF2vWWfFF

Running ox (走牛) 
Limited range: The running ox can move one or two squares diagonally backward.
Range: It can move any number of free squares in a straight line orthogonally forward, sideways or diagonally forward.
Notation: bF2fsWWfFF

Chariot soldier (車兵) 
Limited range: The chariot soldier can move one or two squares orthogonally sideways.
Ranging: It can move any number of free squares in a straight line orthogonally forward, orthogonally backward or in the four diagonal directions.
Notation: sW2fWWFF

Fire demon (火鬼) and Water buffalo (水牛) 
Limited range: The fire demon and water buffalo can move one or two squares orthogonally forward or backward.
Ranging: They  can move any number of free squares in a straight line orthogonally sideways or in the four diagonal directions.
Notation: vW2sWWFF

The fire demon cannot burn other pieces as in tenjiku shogi.

Strong bear (強熊) 
Limited range: The strong bear can move one or two squares orthogonally backward.
Ranging: It can move any number of free squares in a straight line orthogonally forward, sideways or in the four diagonal directions.
Notation: bW2fsWWFF

Liberated horse (風馬) 
Step: The liberated horse can move one square diagonally forward.
Limited range: It can move one or two squares orthogonally backward.
Ranging: It can move any number of free squares in a straight line orthogonally forward.
Notation: fFbW2fWW

Vertical bear (竪熊) and Vertical soldier (竪兵) 
Step: The vertical bear and vertical soldier can move one square orthogonally backward.
Limited range: They can move one or two squares orthogonally sideways.
Ranging: They can move any number of free squares in a straight line orthogonally forward.
Notation: bWsW2fWW

Tiger soldier (虎兵) 
Step: The tiger soldier can move one square orthogonally backward.
Limited range: It can move one or two squares orthogonally forward.
Range: It can move any number of free squares in a straight line diagonally forward.
Notation: bWfW2fFF

Earth dragon (地龍) 
Step: The earth dragon can move one square orthogonally forward or diagonally backward.
Limited range: It can move one or two squares in the four diagonal directions.
Ranging: It can move any number of free squares in a straight line diagonally backward.
Notation: fWfF2bFF

The Japanese Wikipedia describes another set of movements for this piece.

Step: The earth dragon can move one square orthogonally backward or diagonally forward.
Limited range: It can move one or two squares orthogonally forward.
Ranging: It can move any number of free squares in a straight line diagonally backward.
Notation: fFbWfW2bFF

Silver chariot (銀車) 
Step: The silver chariot can move one square diagonally backward.
Limited range: It can move one or two squares diagonally forward.
Ranging: It can move any number of free squares in a straight line orthogonally forward or backward.
Notation: bFfF2vWW

Stone chariot (石車) 
Step: The stone chariot can move one square diagonally forward.
Limited range: It can move one or two squares orthogonally sideways.
Ranging: It can move any number of squares orthogonally forward or backward.
Notation: fFsW2vWW

Side soldier (横兵) 
Step: The side soldier can move one square orthogonally backward.
Limited range: It can move one or two squares orthogonally forward.
Ranging: It can move any number of free squares in a straight line orthogonally sideways.
Notation: bWfW2sWW

Gold chariot (金車) 
Step: The gold chariot can move one square in the four diagonal directions.
Limited range: It can move one or two squares orthogonally sideways.
Ranging: It can move any number of free squares in a straight line orthogonally forward or backward.
Notation: FsW2vWW

Boar soldier (猪兵), leopard soldier (豹兵) and bear soldier (熊兵) 
Step: The boar soldier, leopard soldier and bear soldier can move one square orthogonally backward.
Limited range: They can move one or two squares orthogonally sideways.
Ranging: They can move any number of free squares in a straight line forward, orthogonally or diagonally.
Notation: bWsW2fWWfFF

Free pup (奔狗), free ox (奔牛), free horse (奔馬) and free pig (奔豚) 
Step: The free pup, the free ox, the free horse and the free pig can move one square diagonally backward.
Limited range: It can move one or two squares orthogonally sideways.
Ranging: It can move any number of free squares in a straight line orthogonally forward or backward; or diagonally forward.
Notation: FsW2vWWfFF

Little standard (小旗) 
Step: The little standard can move one square diagonally backward.
Limited range: It can move one or two squares diagonally forward.
Ranging: It can move any number of free squares in a straight line in the four orthogonal directions.
Notation: WWbFfF2

Copper chariot (銅車) 
Limited range: The copper chariot can move one to three squares diagonally forward.
Ranging: It can move any number of free squares in a straight line orthogonally forward or backward.
Notation: fF3vWW

Forest demon (森鬼) 
Limited range: The forest demon can move one to three squares orthogonally forward or sideways.
Ranging: It can move any number of free squares in a straight line orthogonally backward or diagonally forward.
Notation: fsW3bWWfFF

Great dragon (大龍) 
Limited range: The great dragon can move one to three squares orthogonally forward or backward.
Ranging: It can move any number of free squares in a straight line in the four diagonal directions.
Notation: FFvW3

Center standard (中旗) and front standard (前旗) 
Limited range: The center standard and front standard can move one to three squares in the four diagonal directions.
Ranging: They can move any number of free squares in a straight line in the four orthogonal directions.
They have the same range of movement but promote differently (see above). Uniquely, when a center standard promotes to a front standard, it gains no new abilities.
Notation: F3WW

Great dove (大鳩) 
Limited range: The great dove can move one to three squares in the four orthogonal directions.
Ranging: It can move any number of free squares in a straight line in the four diagonal directions.
Notation: W3FF

Great standard (大旗) 
Limited range: The great standard can move one to three squares diagonally backward.
Ranging: It can move any number of free squares in a straight line diagonally forward or in the four orthogonal directions.
Notation: WWbF3fFF

Vertical wolf (竪狼) 
Step: The vertical wolf can move one square orthogonally sideways.
Limited range: It can move one to three squares orthogonally backward.
Ranging: It can move any number of free squares in a straight line orthogonally forward.
Notation: sWbW3fWW

Side serpent (横蛇) 
Step: The side serpent can move one square orthogonally backward.
Limited range: It can move one to three squares orthogonally forward.
Ranging: It can move any number of free squares in a straight line orthogonally sideways.
Notation: bWfW3sWW

Cloud eagle (雲鷲) 
Step: The cloud eagle can move one square orthogonally sideways.
Limited range: It can move one to three squares diagonally forward.
Ranging: It can move any number of free squares in a straight line orthogonally forward or backward.
Notation: sWfF3vWW

Goose wing (鴻翼) 
Step: The goose wing can move one square in the four diagonal directions.
Limited range: It can move one, two or three squares orthogonally sideways.
Range: It can move any number of squares orthogonally forward or backward.
Notation: FsW3vWW

Horse soldier (馬兵) and ox soldier (牛兵) 
Step: The horse soldier and ox soldier can move one square orthogonally backward.
Limited range: They can move one to three squares orthogonally sideways.
Ranging: They can move any number of free squares in a straight line forward, orthogonally or diagonally.
They have the same range of movement but promote differently (see above).
Notation: bWsW3fWWfFF

Spear general (鎗将) 
Limited range: The spear general can move one or two squares orthogonally backward.
Limited range: It can move one, two or three squares orthogonally sideways.
Range: It can move any number of free squares in a straight line orthogonally forward.
Notation: bW2sW3fWW

Burning general (炮将) 
Limited range: The burning general can move one or two squares orthogonally backward.
Limited range: It can move one to three squares orthogonally sideways.
Range: It can move any number of free squares in a straight line forward, orthogonally or diagonally.
Notation: bW2sW3fWWfFF

Beast bird (獣鳥) and captive bird (禽鳥) 
Limited range: The beast bird and captive bird can move one or two squares orthogonally backward.
Limited range: They can move one to three squares orthogonally sideways.
Range: They can move any number of free squares in a straight line orthogonally forward or in the four diagonal directions.
Notation: FFbW2sW3fWW

Longbow soldier (弩兵) and Great leopard (大豹) 
Step: The longbow soldier and the great leopard can move one square orthogonally backward.
Limited range: It can move one or two squares orthogonally sideways.
Limited range: It can move one, two or three squares diagonally forward.
Ranging: It can move any number of free squares in a straight line orthogonally forward.
Notation: bWsW2fWWfF3

Thunder runner (雷走) 
Limited range: The thunder runner can move one to four squares orthogonally sideways or backward.
Range: It can move any number of free squares in a straight line forward, orthogonally or diagonally.
Notation: bsW4fWWfFF

Fire dragon (火龍) 
Limited range: The fire dragon can move one or two squares diagonally backward.
Limited range: It can move one to four squares diagonally forward.
Ranging: It can move any number of free squares in a straight line in the four orthogonal directions.
Notation: WWbF2fF4

Water dragon (水龍) 
Limited range: The water dragon can move one or two squares diagonally forward.
Limited range: It can move one to four squares diagonally backward.
Ranging: It can move any number of free squares in a straight line in the four orthogonal directions.
Notation: WWfF2bF4

Longbow general (弩将) 
Limited range: The longbow general can move one to five squares orthogonally sideways.
Range: It can move any number of free squares in a straight line orthogonally forward, backward or diagonally forward.
Notation: fFsW5vWW

Right phoenix (右鵰) 
Limited range: The right phoenix can move one to five squares orthogonally sideways.
Range: It can move any number of free squares in a straight line in the four diagonal directions.
Notation: FFsW5

Peaceful mountain (泰山) 
Limited range: The peaceful mountain can move one to five squares orthogonally forward or sideways.
Range: It can move any number of free squares in a straight line in the four diagonal directions.
Notation: FFfsW5

Free demon (奔鬼) 
Limited range: The free demon can move one to five squares orthogonally backward.
Ranging: It can move any number of free squares in a straight line in the four diagonal directions or orthogonally right.
Notation: FFbW5rWW

The Japanese Wikipedia describes another set of movements for this piece.

Limited range: The free demon can move one to five squares orthogonally forward or backward.
Ranging: It can move any number of free squares in a straight line in the four diagonal directions or orthogonally sideways.
Notation: FFvW5sWW

Free dream-eater (奔獏) 
Ranging: The free dream-eater can move any number of free squares in a straight line in the four diagonal directions.
Ranging: It can move any number of free squares in a straight line orthogonally forward or backward.
Limited range: It can move one to five squares orthogonally sideways.
Notation: FFsW5vWW

Free fire (奔火) 
Limited range: The free fire can move one to five squares orthogonally forward or backward.
Range: It can move any number of free squares in a straight line orthogonally sideways or in the four diagonal directions.
Notation: FFvW5sWW

Running dragon (走龍) 
Limited range: The running dragon can move one to five squares orthogonally backward.
Range: It can move any number of free squares in a straight line orthogonally forward, sideways or in the four diagonal directions.
Notation: FFbW5fsWW

Great shark (大鱗) 
Limited range: The shark can move one or two squares diagonally backward.
Limited range: It can move one to five squares diagonally forward.
Range: It can move any number of free squares in a straight line in the four orthogonal directions.
Notation: WWbF2fF5

Crossbow general (弓将) 
Limited range: The crossbow general can move one or two squares orthogonally backward.
Limited range: It can move one to three squares orthogonally sideways.
Limited range: It can move one to five squares diagonally forward.
Range: It can move any number of free squares in a straight line orthogonally forward.
Notation: bW2sW3fWWfF5

Playful cockatoo (遊䳇) 
Limited range: The playful cockatoo can move one or two squares diagonally backward.
Limited range: It can move one to three squares diagonally forward.
Limited range: It can move one to five squares orthogonally sideways.
Range: It can move any number of free squares in a straight line orthogonally forward or backward.
Notation: bF2fF3sW5vWW

Knight (桂馬) 
Jump: A knight jumps at an angle intermediate between orthogonal and diagonal, amounting to one square forward plus one square diagonally forward, in a single motion. That is, it has a choice of two forward destinations.
The knight ignores intervening pieces on the way to its destination, though its destination square must of course be either empty, or occupied by an opponent's piece (in which case the opponent's piece is captured), just as with any other moving piece.
Notation: ffN

Flying dragon (飛龍) 
Jump: The flying dragon can jump to the second square in the four diagonal directions.
Because it cannot move orthogonally or to every diagonal square, a flying dragon can only reach one eighth of the squares on the board.
Notation: A

Kirin (麒麟) 
Step: A kirin can move one square orthogonally forward or backward, or in the four diagonal directions.
Jump: It can jump to the second square orthogonally sideways.
Notation: FsD

Phoenix (鳳凰) 
Step: The phoenix can move one square in the four orthogonal directions.
Jump: It can jump to the second square in the four diagonal directions.
Notation: WA

Flying cat (飛猫) 
Step: The flying cat can move one square orthogonally backward or diagonally backward.
Jump: It can jump to the third square orthogonally forward or sideways, or diagonally forward.
Notation: bWbFfsHfG

Running horse (走馬) 
Step: The running horse can move one square orthogonally backward.
Ranging: It can move any number of free squares in a straight line orthogonally or diagonally forward.
Jump: It can jump to the second square diagonally backwards
Notation: bWbAfWWfFF

Mountain falcon (山鷹) 
Limited range: The mountain falcon can move one or two squares diagonally backward.
Jump: It can jump to the second square orthogonally forward.
Ranging: It can move any number of free squares in a straight line in the four orthogonal directions or diagonally forward.
Notation: fDbF2vWWfFF.  If this piece can move orthogonally sideways, notation can be represented as fDbF2WWfFF
Note: This is the depiction of the diagram in Japanese wiki. However, the text makes no mention of an ability to move orthogonally sideways.

Little turtle (小亀) 
Limited range: The little turtle can move one or two squares orthogonally sideways.
Jump: It can jump to the second square orthogonally forward or backward.
Ranging: It can move any number of free squares in a straight line orthogonally forward or backward, or in the four diagonal directions.
Notation: FFsW2vDvWW

Great stag (大鹿) 
Limited range: The great stag can move one or two squares diagonally backward.
Jump: It can jump to the second square diagonally forward.
Ranging: It can move any number of free squares in a straight line in the four orthogonal directions.
Notation: WWfAbF2

Left mountain eagle (左山鷲) 
Limited range: The left mountain eagle can move one or two squares diagonally backward to the right.
Jump: It can jump to the second square along either left diagonal.
Ranging: It can move any number of free squares in a straight line diagonally left, diagonally forward to the right, or in the four orthogonal directions.
Notation: WWlAbrF2fFFblFF

Right mountain eagle (右山鷲) 
Limited range: The right mountain eagle can move one or two squares diagonally backward to the left.
Jump: It can jump to the second square along either right diagonal.
Ranging: It can move any number of free squares in a straight line diagonally right, diagonally forward to the left, or in the four orthogonal directions.
Notation: WWrAblF2fFFbrFF

Kirin-master (麟師) and Great turtle (大亀) 
Limited range: The kirin-master and great turtle can move one to three squares orthogonally sideways.
Range: They can move any number of free squares in a straight line diagonally or orthogonally forward or backward.
Jump: They can jump to the third square orthogonally forward or backward.
Notation: FFvHsW3vWW

Phoenix-master (鳳師) 
Limited range: The phoenix-master can move one to three squares orthogonally sideways.
Range: It can move any number of free squares in a straight line diagonally or orthogonally forward or backward.
Jump: It can jump to the third square diagonally forward.
Notation: FFfGsW3vWW

Great master (大師) 
Limited range: The great master can move one to five squares orthogonally sideways or diagonally backward.
Jump: It can jump to the third square forward, orthogonally or diagonally.
Ranging: It can move any number of free squares in a straight line forward, orthogonally or diagonally, or orthogonally backward.
Notation: fGfHbF5sW5fFFvWW

Horned falcon (角鷹) 
Ranging: The horned falcon can move as a queen.
Jump: It can jump to the second square orthogonally forward.
Notation: WWFFfD

Soaring eagle (飛鷲) 
Jump: The soaring eagle can jump to the second square diagonally forward.
Ranging: It can move any number of free squares in a straight line in any direction, orthogonally or diagonally.
Notation: WWFFfA

Roaring dog (吼犬) 
Limited range: The roaring dog can move one to three squares diagonally backward.
Jump: It can jump to the third square diagonally forward or in the four orthogonal directions.
Ranging: It can move any number of free squares in a straight line diagonally forward or in the four orthogonal directions.
Notation: HWWbF3fFF

Lion-dog (狛犬) 
Jump: The lion-dog can jump to the third square in any direction, orthogonally or diagonally.
Ranging: It can move any number of free squares in a straight line in any direction, orthogonally or diagonally.
Notation: WWFFHG

Great dream-eater (大獏) 
Jump: The great dream-eater can jump to the third square orthogonally sideways.
Range: It can move any number of free squares in a straight line in any direction, orthogonally or diagonally.
Notation: WWFFsH

Heavenly horse (天馬) 
Jump: The heavenly horse jumps at an angle intermediate between orthogonal and diagonal, amounting to one square forward plus one square diagonally forward, in a single motion; or one square backward plus one square diagonally backward, in a single motion.
It ignores intervening pieces while jumping to its destination, though its destination square must of course be either empty, or occupied by an opponent's piece (in which case the opponent's piece is captured), just as with any other moving piece.
Range: It can move any number of free squares in a straight line orthogonally forward.
Notation: ffNbbNfWW

Spirit turtle (霊亀) 
Jump: The spirit turtle can jump to the third square in the four orthogonal directions.
Range: It can move as a queen.
Notation: WWFFH

Treasure turtle (宝亀) 
Jump: The treasure turtle can jump to the second square in the four orthogonal directions.
Range: It can move as a queen.
Notation: WWFFD

Wooden dove (鳩槃) 
Limited range: The wooden dove can move one or two squares in the four orthogonal directions.
Ranging: It can move any number of free squares in a straight line in the four diagonal directions, but has the option of jumping in these directions instead of ranging.
Jump plus limited range: It can jump to the third square in the four diagonal directions, and then (optionally) move one or two squares in the same direction.
Notation: W2FFG(G-F2)

Center master (中師) 
Limited range: The center master can move one to three squares orthogonally sideways or diagonally backward.
Jump: It can jump to the second square and then move any number of free squares in a straight line orthogonally forward or backward, or diagonally forward.
It need not jump before moving nor move after jumping. 
Notation: sW3bF3vDfAbWWfFF(fA-FF)(vD-WW)

Roc-master (鵬師) 
Limited range: The roc-master can move one to five squares orthogonally sideways or diagonally backward.
Jump/ Ranging: It can jump to the third square and then move any number of free squares in a straight line diagonally forward.
Ranging: It can move any number of free squares in a straight line orthogonally forward or backward.
It need not jump before moving nor move after jumping. 
Notation: GbF5sW5vWW(G-FF)

Free eagle (奔鷲) 
Jump/ranging: The free eagle can jump to the second or third square, and then move any number of free squares in a straight line in the four orthogonal directions or diagonally backward.
Jump/ranging: It can jump to the second to fourth square, and then move any number of free squares in a straight line diagonally forward.
It need not jump before moving or move after jumping.
Notation: WWFFDAHG(4,4)(D-WW)(A-FF)(H-WW)(G-FF)((4,4)-FF)

Free bird (奔翅) 
Limited range: The free bird can move one to three squares diagonally backward.
Range: It can move any number of free squares in a straight line in the four orthogonal directions.
Jump and range: It can jump up to three pieces diagonally forward, and then optionally continue any number of free squares in that direction.
Notation: WWbF3(f(mpFF)3-FF)

Great falcon (大鷹) 
Range: The great falcon can move any number of squares in any direction, orthogonally or diagonally.
Jump: It can jump to the second square orthogonally forward before (optionally) moving on in that direction. 
Notation: WWFFvD(vD-WW)

Teaching king (教王) 
Jump and range: The teaching king can jump up to three pieces along a straight line in any diagonal or orthogonal direction, and then optionally continue any number of free squares in that direction.
Notation: HG(H-WW)(G-FF)

Mountain crane (山鶻) 
Range: The mountain crane can move as a queen.
Jump: It can jump to the third square and (optionally) continue in that direction.
Notation: WWFFHG(H-WW)(G-FF)

Great eagle (大鷲) 
Range: The great eagle can move as a queen.
Jump: It can jump to the second square in any direction, orthogonally or diagonally, and (optionally) continue moving in that direction.
Notation: WWFFDA(D-WW)(A-FF)

Great elephant (大象) 
Limited range: The great elephant can move one to three squares diagonally forward.
Jump and range: It can jump up to three pieces in a straight line diagonally backward or in one of the four orthogonal directions, and then optionally continue any number of free squares in that direction.
Notation: fF3pWW(b(mpFF)3-FF)

Golden bird (金翅) 
Limited range: The golden bird can move one to three squares orthogonally sideways or diagonally backward.
Range: It can move any number of free squares in a straight line orthogonally forward or backward.
Jump and range: It can jump up to three pieces diagonally forward, and then optionally continue any number of free squares in that direction.
Notation: bF3sW3vW(f(mpFF)3-FF)

Ancient dragon (元龍) 
Range: The ancient dragon can move any number of free squares in a straight line in the four diagonal directions.
Ranging jump: It can jump over any number of squares orthogonally forward or backward.
Notation: FF(v(mpWW)35-WW)

Rain demon (霖鬼) 
Limited range: The rain demon can move one or two squares orthogonally sideways or diagonally backward.
Limited range: It can move one to three squares orthogonally forward.
Range: It can move any number of free squares in a straight line orthogonally backward.
Range jump: It can jump any number of squares along either forward diagonal.
Notation: fW3sW2bWW(f(mpFF)35-FF)

Rook general (飛将) 
Range capture: The rook general can fly over any number of squares along a straight line in any orthogonal direction, so long as they don't contain a royal (king or prince) or another range capturing piece. All pieces it flies over are removed from the game.
Notation: ((cWWcdWW)35-WW), ignoring capturing restrictions

Bishop general (角将) 
Range capture: The bishop general can fly over any number of squares along a straight line in any diagonal direction, so long as they don't contain a royal (king or prince) or another range capturing piece. All pieces it flies over are removed from the game.
Notation: ((cFFcdFF)35-FF), ignoring capturing restrictions

Great general (大将) 
Range capture: The great general can fly over any number of squares along a straight line in any direction, orthogonally or diagonally, as long as they don't contain a royal (king or prince) or another great general. All pieces it flies over are removed from the game.
Notation: ((cWWcdWWcFFcdFF)35-WWFF), ignoring capturing restrictions

Violent dragon (猛龍) 
Limited range: The violent dragon can move one or two squares in the four orthogonal directions.
Range capture: It can fly over any number of pieces along one of the four diagonal directions, as long as they don't include a royal (king or prince) or another range-jumping piece. All pieces it flies over are removed from the game.
Notation: W2((cFFcdFF)35-FF), ignoring capturing restrictions

Flying crocodile (飛鰐) 
Limited range: The flying crocodile can move one or two squares diagonally backward.
Limited range: It can move one to three squares diagonally forward.
Range capture: It can jump any number of pieces in one of the four orthogonal directions, as long as these do not include a royal (king or prince) or another range-capturing piece. Any piece it jumps over is removed from the board.
Notation: bF2fF3((cWWcdWW)35-WW), ignoring capturing restrictions

Vice general (副将) 
Jump: The vice general can jump to the second square in the four orthogonal directions. This is a standard jump.
Range capture: It can fly over any number of squares along one of the four diagonal directions, as long as they don't contain a royal (king or prince), great general, or another vice general. All pieces it flies over are removed from the game.
Notation: D((cFFcdFF)35-FF), ignoring capturing restrictions

Hook-mover (鉤行) 
Hook move: The hook-mover can move any number of free squares in a straight line in the four orthogonal directions, then (optionally) turn 90° and move any number of free squares in a perpendicular direction.
Notation: WW(WW-sWW)

Long-nosed goblin (tengu) (天狗) 
Hook move: The long-nosed goblin can move any number of free squares in a straight line in the four diagonal directions, then (optionally) turn 90° and move any number of free squares in a perpendicular direction.
Notation: FF(FF-sFF)

Unlike in other shogi variants, in taikyoku the tengu cannot move orthogonally, and therefore can only reach half of the squares on the board. This is the move of the capricorn, and may be an error.

Capricorn (摩羯) 
Hook move: The capricorn can move any number of free squares in a straight line in the four diagonal directions, then (optionally) turn 90° and move any number of free squares in a perpendicular direction.
Notation: FF(FF-sFF).  If the capricorn can also move one square orthogonally, the notation can be represented as WFF(FF-sFF)
The description of the Tengu imply the capricorn also can move one square orthogonally. If it isn't the case, it can only reach half of the squares on the board.

Peacock (孔雀) 
Hook move: The peacock can move any number of free squares in a straight line along one of the two forward diagonals, then (optionally) turn 90° and move any number of free squares in a straight line in a perpendicular diagonal direction.
Limited range: It can move one or two squares in one of the two rearward diagonals.
Notation: bF2fFF(fFF-sFF)

Heavenly tetrarch king (四天王) 
Range: The heavenly tetrarch king can move any number of free squares in a straight line in any direction, orthogonally or diagonally.
Jump: It can jump to the second square before (optionally) moving on in that direction.
It can capture a piece on an adjacent square without moving (igui).
Notation: WWFFDA(cW-bW)

Lion (獅子) 
Area move/double capture: The lion can step one square in any direction up to twice in a turn. It can change directions after its first step, and is not restricted to following one of the eight orthogonal or diagonal directions. That is, it can also step to one of the in-between squares that a knight jumps to in Western chess.
Unlike the hook-movers, it can continue after a capture on the first step, potentially capturing two pieces on each turn.
By moving back to its starting square, it can effectively capture a piece on an adjacent square without moving. This is called 居喰い igui "stationary feeding".
A similar move without capturing leaves the board unchanged, which is a way to pass a turn.
Jump: The lion can jump anywhere within two squares. This is equivalent to jumping in any of the eight diagonal or orthogonal directions, or making any of the jumps of a knight in Western chess.

Notation: OWFDAN(W-bW)(F-bF)

Note: The restrictions when capturing a lion in chu shogi do not apply in taikyoku shogi.

Furious fiend (奮迅) 
Area move/double capture or jump: The furious fiend can move as a lion; or
Limited range: It can move three squares in any direction, orthogonal or diagonal. (A normal move: it can only capture once and cannot jump when doing this.)
Notation: WFDANHG(W-bW)(F-bF)

Buddhist spirit (法性) 
Area move/double capture: The Buddhist spirit can move as a lion, or
Range: It can move as a queen.
Notation: WWFFDAN(W-bW)(F-bF)

Lion hawk (獅鷹) 
Area move/double capture/ranging: The lion hawk can move as a lion or as a bishop.
Jump/ranging: It can leap to the second square in any diagonal direction before making a bishop move in that same direction.
Notation: WFFDAN(W-bW)(F-bF)(A-FF)

See also 
 Chu shogi
 Dai dai shogi
 Dai shogi
 Heian dai shogi
 Maka dai dai shogi
 Shogi variant
 Tai shogi
 Tenjiku shogi
 Wa shogi

Notes

References

George Hodges: Ten Shogi Variants
Isao Umebayashi: Sekai no Shogi

External links 
 Taikyoku Shogi at The Chess Variant Pages
 Shogi Net
 History.chess.free/taikyoku shogi
 An online flash version of the game with illustrated piece movements. No AI.

Shogi variants